Montefeltro is a historical and geographical region in Marche, which was historically part of Romagna. It gave its name to the Montefeltro family, who ruled in the area during the Middle Ages and the Renaissance.
Regions of Italy

Overview
Montefeltro covers mostly the mountain part of the Province of Pesaro and Urbino (Marche) and the south-western area of the Province of Rimini (Emilia-Romagna). It comprises also two municipalities of the Province of Arezzo, Tuscany, and the Republic of San Marino. The most important town of the region is Novafeltria. Today it is part of the Roman Catholic Diocese of San Marino-Montefeltro, formerly until 1978 the Roman Catholic Diocese of Montefeltro.

Municipalities

See also

 
 House of Montefeltro
 Roman Catholic Diocese of San Marino-Montefeltro

References

 

Geographical, historical and cultural regions of Italy
Geography of San Marino
Geography of Tuscany
Geography of the Marche
Geography of Emilia-Romagna